Walter Antonio Chávez Hernández (born 24 July 1971, in Yuscarán) is a Honduran teacher and politician. He currently serves as deputy of the National Congress of Honduras representing the National Party of Honduras for El Paraíso Department.

References

1971 births
Living people
Deputies of the National Congress of Honduras
National Party of Honduras politicians
People from Yoro Department
Honduran educators
21st-century Honduran politicians